Midday Adventures is a 2017 Iranian drama film directed by Mohammad Hossein Mahdavian and written by Mahdavian and Ebrahim Amini. The film centers on the MKO assassinations in 1982 and the events after the dismissal of Abolhassan Banisadr. It screened for the first time at the 35th Fajr Film Festival and was released on March 15, 2017 in Iran.

The film won both Best Film and Audience Choice of Best Film, making it one of only five films in the history of cinema of Iran to win the latter. (the other four are The Glass Agency, Low Heights, In Amethyst Color and Crazy Rook).

Plot 
After the dismissal of president Bani-Sadr by the Iranian parliament, tensions became high. Terrorist groups began to assassinate Iranian officials. The Iranian government and the Iranian Revolutionary Guard Corps (IRGC) attempted to arrest these terrorists. A young IRGC member and a woman of the terrorist groups are known each other. They were classmate in college.

Cast 
 
 Mehrdad Sedighian
 Ahmad Mehranfar
 Hadi Hejazifar
 Javad Ezzati
 Mahdi Zaminpardaz
 Mahya Dehghani
 Kian Rostami
 Linda Kiani
 Hossein Mehri
 Mehdi Pakdel
 Amirhossein Hashemi

Awards

 Crystal Simorgh for Best Film
 Crystal Simorgh for Audience Choice of Best Film
 Crystal Simorgh for Best Costume and Production Design
 Crystal Simorg for Best National Film

Sequel

Midday Adventures: Trace of Blood is the sequel. It screened for the first time on January 30, 2019 at the 37th Fajr Film Festival and was released on September 25, 2019 in Iran.

References

External links
Iranian.film

2017 directorial debut films
2010s Persian-language films
Iranian war films
Biographical films about military personnel
Iranian biographical films
Crystal Simorgh for Best Film winners
Crystal Simorgh for Audience Choice of Best Film winners